Area code 901 is a telephone area code in the North American Numbering Plan (NANP) for Memphis, Tennessee, and most of its inner-ring suburbs. it is the smallest numbering plan area in the state.

History

Area code 901 was one of the original North American area codes created in 1947 for the first nationwide telephone numbering plan. It served the entire state of Tennessee until 1954, when the state was divided in a flash cut into two numbering plan areas. West Tennessee retained the area code, while the eastern two-thirds of the state, essentially, the part of the state east of the Tennessee River, received area code 615.

Despite the presence of Memphis, the state's largest city at the time, West Tennessee is not as densely populated as the state's other two Grand Divisions. As a result, while the eastern two-thirds of the state went from one area code to four from 1995 to 1999, 901 remained the sole area code for West Tennessee for 47 years. However, by the turn of the millennium, 901 was close to exhaustion due to the Memphis area's rapid growth, as well as the proliferation of cell phones and pagers. On September 17, 2001, area code 731 was assigned to most of West Tennessee outside the immediate Memphis area.  Area code 901 remained in service for Fayette, Shelby and Tipton counties, an area largely coextensive with the inner ring of the Memphis area.

Despite the Memphis area's growth and the continued demand for telecommunication services, 901 is not in danger of exhaustion. It is one of the few urban area codes that has not been overlaid, making Memphis one of the largest cities where seven-digit dialing is still possible. According to 2021 projections, it will likely stay that way until about 2035.

Service area
Major cities in these counties are the following.

Fayette County 
 Somerville

Shelby County
 Arlington
 Bartlett
 Collierville
 Cordova
 Germantown
 Memphis
 Millington

Tipton County 
 Covington

See also
List of NANP area codes

References

External links

901
901
Telecommunications-related introductions in 1947
1947 establishments in Tennessee